William Rittenhouse (May 7, 1794 – November 19, 1862) was an American politician who was a member of the Wisconsin State Senate.

Biography
Rittenhouse was born on May 7, 1794 in Hunterdon County, New Jersey. He died on November 19, 1862 in Jefferson, Green County, Wisconsin and was buried in Monroe, Wisconsin.

Career
Rittenhouse was the clerk of the Green County District Court in the 1840s. Rittenhouse was a member of the Senate from the 8th District during the 1850 and 1851 sessions. He was a Democrat.

References

External links
 The Political Graveyard
 

Politicians from Hunterdon County, New Jersey
People from Green County, Wisconsin
Democratic Party Wisconsin state senators
1794 births
1862 deaths
Burials in Wisconsin
19th-century American politicians